The Alabama Crimson Tide gymnastics is a Division I gymnastics team representing the University of Alabama in NCAA competition. The Tide hosts its home matches in Coleman Coliseum on the university's Tuscaloosa, Alabama campus.  One of only seven gymnastics teams to win the national title, the Crimson Tide has won six NCAA championships, ten SEC championships, and an NCAA-record 32 Regional championships.  The team is led by first-year head coach Ashley Priess-Johnston, who succeeded Dana Duckworth following the 2022 season.

History

The early years
With the passage of the 1972 Title 9 Amendment which provided for the inclusion of women in sports, The University of Alabama Gymnastics team existed as a club sport. With the first team acting as a club sport In 1972, The University of Alabama Gymnastics Team existed and competed with such teams as Jacksonville State until it was later sanctioned as a viable gymnastic team in 1975.

The University of Alabama's first gymnastics team debuted in 1975 and began with a loss to Georgia College. The team moved along in relative obscurity, going through four coaches in four years, until the summer of 1978 when Sarah Campbell was announced as the fifth head coach of the Crimson Tide. Her first team finished the year 7-7 and she followed up in 1980 with the first winning season in school history. In 1983, the Crimson Tide made its first championship appearance in Salt Lake City, Utah after winning the South Region, defeating the Florida Gators.

The eighties
Alabama blossomed into a perennial contender under Sarah Patterson and continued to qualify for nationals as well as producing numerous All-Americans. Penney Hauschild became the Tide's first NCAA Champion in 1985 when she won the uneven bars as well as capturing the All-Around title, becoming the first non-Utah gymnast to do so. She would defend her All-Around title in 1986 while also winning the floor title.

The Crimson Tide continued to advance throughout the decade and finally won their first NCAA title in 1988.  The Tide marched into Salt Lake City and defeated host Utah (189.50) and defending champion Georgia (186.80) with a commanding 190.05. 1988 also marked the Tide's first SEC title, when the competition was hosted in Tuscaloosa, Alabama.

The nineties
The 1990s began with a bang for the Tide as Alabama was crowned the 1990 SEC Champions. The team won its second national title in 1991 before a home crowd in Tuscaloosa. A rivalry between Alabama and Georgia, which endures to this day, began around this time. Patterson and Georgia coach Suzanne Yoculan hosted frequent dual meets between their teams to inspire the rivalry. The Tide first sold out Coleman Coliseum on February 1, 1997, when 15,043 fans watched Alabama take on Georgia; the Tide continues to report some of the highest fan turnout of any program, with an average attendance at home meets in 2014 of 12,826 (second only to Utah).

In 1995, the Tide won their third SEC Tournament championship in Gainesville.  Alabama went into their final rotation in fourth place before scoring the highest team vault total in NCAA history as all their gymnasts scored 9.9 or higher, with junior Kim Kelly capping off the night with a perfect 10.

Alabama finished the 1996 season with their third national championship, recording a record team score of 198.025. However, 1997 saw the Crimson Tide fail to reach the Super Six for the first time since 1983.

The new millennium
Alabama captured their fourth SEC title in 2000, but only managed a fifth-place finish at nationals that year, improving to fourth in 2001. The Tide looked dangerous once again in 2002 as Andreé Pickens, Raegan Tomasek, Alexis Brion, Kristin Sterner, and freshman Jeana Rice led the Tide to a fourth national championship at home in Tuscaloosa, defeating two-time defending national champion UCLA. In 2003, the Tide won their fifth SEC title with the youngest squad in program history, with seven freshman, three sophomores, three juniors and one senior. Nationally, Rice won the All Around in 2004 while freshman Ashley Miles won the first of her three national titles on vault. The Crimson Tide added their first Olympian to the team with Terin Humphrey, a two-time silver medalist at the 2004 Olympics, who joined Alabama in 2005 and would go on to win two national uneven bar titles.

In 2007, the Tide marked their first absence from the Super Six since 1997. In 2009, Alabama was the first gymnastics program to draw two crowds of over 15,000 in one season. They finished the season in second place behind Georgia, their best result since 2005.

The 2010s
Alabama maintained a rank of No. 1 throughout the 2010 regular season, but struggled at the SEC championships and finished the night as runners up behind Florida. Despite putting on one of the top performances of the preliminaries, Alabama stumbled in their first rotation at Nationals, sinking as low as sixth place during the final competition before rallying back to finish 3rd.

The Tide began the 2011 season with eight freshmen on the team, making it the largest class in school history and accounting for nearly half the roster. The Tide finished the regular season at 11–1, and won the 2011 SEC Championship, taking down No. 1 Florida in the process. Alabama entered the Super Six that year as the No. 1 seed and defeated defending champions UCLA with a winning score of 197.650, their highest Super Six score since 1996. The Tide defeated the overwhelming favorite Florida to win a second consecutive title in 2012 with a score of 197.850.

Alabama entered the 2013 postseason primed for a close battle with Florida in the Super Six, but uncharacteristic mistakes saw Alabama slip to third place behind Oklahoma, while Florida won its first national title. As the host school in 2014, Alabama won their eighth SEC Championship with a team score of 197.875, but fell to fourth place at Nationals after having to count a fall. Alabama's win at the 2014 Seattle Regional marked Patterson's thousandth career win.

In 2015 Dana Duckworth was announced as the head coach after Sarah Patterson retired. She led them to their second straight SEC title, 9th overall, their 21st regional title and a fourth-place finish at Nationals.

The Power of Pink
The Power of Pink is the name given to one of the Crimson Tide's home meets each season in which all the participants and fans wear pink to support breast cancer awareness.  The first Power of Pink meet, designated the "Drive 4 the Cause" meet, was held in February 2005 at Alabama's home meet against Auburn; Coach Sarah Patterson ordered pink leotards for her team and requested that all fans show up wearing pink.  The meet, now known as the "Pink Meet", is an annual crowd favorite with each following "Pink Meet" selling out.  The movement quickly spread among other NCAA gymnastics teams, with many schools participating in at least one Pink Meet per season, usually in late February or early March.

Among Patterson's early supporters was the local DCH Regional Medical Center, which created the DCH Breast Cancer Fund.  The fund was set up to provide disadvantaged women with means for early detection and treatment for breast cancer.  Other supporters include the University, community leaders and Tuscaloosa Toyota.  Tuscaloosa Toyota became more and more involved donating free pink shirts to give away at the meets and prize give-aways during the meet. Over a decade of Pink Meets, almost $1.5 million has been raised for cancer research at the DCH Fund. Each Alabama gymnast escorts a breast cancer survivor during team introductions at Pink Meets hosted in Coleman Coliseum.

Head coaches

NCAA titles

Alabama has won 29 individual NCAA championships.

Current roster

Head coach:  Ashley Priess Johnston
Assistant coaches:  Justin Spring, Gina Quinlan
Volunteer assistant coach: Kyana George
Strength and conditioning coach: Casey Metoyer
Athletic trainer: Monica Decker Kirkpatrick

Team records

Top team total

Top vault total

Top uneven bars total

Top balance beam total

Top floor total

Past Olympians 
 Terin Humphrey (2004)  
 Dominique Pegg  (2012)
 Kylie Dickson  (2016)
 Shallon Olsen  (2016, 2020)

References

External links
The Official Web Site of Alabama Crimson Tide Gymnastics
GymTide.com Coverage of Alabama Gymnastics